Frederick Anthony John Gernon (born 30 December 1962), commonly known as Irvin Gernon, is an English former football defender who played in the Football League for Ipswich Town, Gillingham, Reading and Northampton Town. He represented England at schoolboy, youth and under-21 levels.

References

External links

1962 births
Living people
Footballers from Birmingham, West Midlands
English footballers
Association football defenders
England schools international footballers
England youth international footballers
England under-21 international footballers
Ipswich Town F.C. players
Northampton Town F.C. players
Gillingham F.C. players
Reading F.C. players
Telford United F.C. players
English Football League players